Big Sand Wash Reservoir is a reservoir in eastern Duchesne County, Utah, United States.

See also
 List of dams and reservoirs in Utah

References

External links

Reservoirs in Utah
Lakes of Duchesne County, Utah